An advocate is a professional in the field of law.

The Advocate, The Advocates or Advocate may also refer to:

Magazines
The Advocate (LGBT magazine), an LGBT magazine based in the United States
The Harvard Advocate, a literary magazine from Harvard University
Advocate: Newsletter of the National Tertiary Education Union, a newsletter of the National Tertiary Education Union

Newspapers
 The Advocate (Louisiana), based in Baton Rouge, the largest daily newspaper in Louisiana, United States
 The Advocate (Contra Costa College), a Contra Costa College student newspaper
 The Advocate (Fairhaven), a community newspaper in Massachusetts, United States
 The Advocate (Melbourne), an Australian Catholic weekly
 The Advocate (Newark), a newspaper in Newark, Ohio, United States
 Advocate (Pittsburgh), a 19th-century newspaper in Pittsburgh, Pennsylvania, United States
 The Advocate (Portland, Oregon), a defunct African-American newspaper in Portland, Oregon, United States
 The Advocate (Red Deer, Alberta), a Canadian newspaper covering central Alberta
 Stamford Advocate, a daily newspaper in Stamford, Connecticut, United States
 The Advocate (Tasmania), an Australian newspaper
 The Advocate-Messenger, a newspaper published in Danville, Kentucky, United States
 CTNow, previously The Advocate Weekly Newspapers, a set of weekly newspapers in Connecticut and Massachusetts, United States
 The Daily Advocate, a daily newspaper in Greenville, Ohio, United States
 Julesburg Advocate, a weekly newspaper in Julesburg, Colorado, United States
 South Cheatham Advocate, a community newspaper in Kingston Springs, Tennessee, United States
 The Victoria Advocate, Victoria, Texas
The Winter Park Advocate a newspaper for African Americans published in Winter Park, Florida

Arts and entertainment
 "The Advocate", a hymn better known as "Before the Throne of God Above" by Charitie Lees Smith
 The Advocate (1925 film), a French silent drama film
 The Hour of the Pig, a 1993 film by Leslie Megahey, titled The Advocate in the USA
 The Advocate: A Missing Body, a 2015 South Korean film by Heo Jong-ho
 The Advocates (TV series), a 1990s Scottish legal drama
 Advocate (2019 film), a documentary film by Rachel Leah Jones and Philippe Bellaiche
 "Advocates" (short story), a 1922 posthumous short story by Franz Kafka

Ships 
 , a small fishing sloop captured from the Confederates in 1861
 , a minesweeper launched on 1942 and transferred to the Soviet Union under Lend-Lease

People 
 Attaullah Advocate, Pakistani politician
 Advocate Nasiruddin (1892–1949), famous lawyer, political and social leader

Places 
 Advocate Harbour
 Advocates Library, law library in Edinburgh

See also
 Advocaat, a Dutch alcoholic beverage
 Advocacy, activity by an individual or group that aims to influence decisions
 Advocatus, a medieval term for an advocate
 Lord Advocate, a legal officer of the Scottish Government and the Crown in Scotland
 Times-Advocate (disambiguation), which could refer to various newspapers